Stacey K. Guerin is an American politician from Maine. Guerin, a Republican, represents a portion of Penobscot County, Maine, including her residence in Glenburn, Maine, in the Maine Senate. She previously was elected to four terms to Maine House of Representatives. She was first elected in 2010. Guerin is a former schoolteacher and holds a degree in Elementary Education from the University of Maine.

House
Guerin ran unopposed for her first term in office in 2010. Facing re-election in 2012, only unenrolled former tribal legislator David Slagger opposed Guerin. Guerin won with 78% of the vote. In 2014, no other candidate again filed to run against Guerin, guaranteeing her re-election. Guering has served a member of the Inland Fisheries and Wildlife Committee as well as on the Judiciary Committee during her time in the Legislature.

Senate
Guerin was first elected to the Maine Senate in 2018 and re-elected in 2020. District 10 includes the towns of Carmel, Corinna, Corinth, Dixmont, Etna, Exeter, Glenburn, Hampden, Hudson, Kenduskeag, Levant, Newburgh, Newport, Plymouth, and Stetson. During her first term, she served on the Labor and Housing Committee. In May 2020, in the midst of the COVID-19 pandemic, she called for freezing the minimum wage.

References

Year of birth missing (living people)
Living people
People from Penobscot County, Maine
University of Maine alumni
Women state legislators in Maine
Republican Party members of the Maine House of Representatives
21st-century American politicians
21st-century American women politicians